Kukuzel Cove is the 1.18 km wide cove indenting for 620 m the north coast of Byers Peninsula between Lair Point and Villard Point on Livingston Island in the South Shetland Islands, Antarctica.  The area was visited by early 19th century sealers.

The cove is “named after the famous Bulgarian church music composer and singer St. Yoan Kukuzel (1280–1360).”

Location
British mapping in 1968, Spanish in 1993 and Bulgarian in 2009.

Maps
 Península Byers, Isla Livingston. Mapa topográfico a escala 1:25000. Madrid: Servicio Geográfico del Ejército, 1992.
 L.L. Ivanov. Antarctica: Livingston Island and Greenwich, Robert, Snow and Smith Islands. Scale 1:120000 topographic map.  Troyan: Manfred Wörner Foundation, 2009.  
 Antarctic Digital Database (ADD). Scale 1:250000 topographic map of Antarctica. Scientific Committee on Antarctic Research (SCAR). Since 1993, regularly upgraded and updated.
 L.L. Ivanov. Antarctica: Livingston Island and Smith Island. Scale 1:100000 topographic map. Manfred Wörner Foundation, 2017.

Notes

References
 Bulgarian Antarctic Gazetteer. Antarctic Place-names Commission. (details in Bulgarian, basic data in English)
 Kukuzel Cove. SCAR Composite Gazetteer of Antarctica.

External links
 Kukuzel Cove. Copernix satellite image

Coves of Livingston Island
Bulgaria and the Antarctic